Jermaine Wilson (born 5 February 1995) is a Caymanian footballer who plays as a defensive midfielder for Academy and the Cayman Islands national team.

Career statistics

References

External links

1995 births
Living people
Association football midfielders
Caymanian footballers
Cayman Islands Premier League players
Cayman Islands international footballers